Grewia hexamita, the giant raisin, is a species of flowering plant in the family Malvaceae, native to Mozambique and adjoining countries. It is a large tree for a Grewia, reaching . It is the most preferred woody plant of African savanna elephants (Loxodonta africana), who browse on it in all seasons, unlike even other species of Grewia.

References

hexamita
Flora of Tanzania
Flora of Mozambique
Flora of Zimbabwe
Flora of the Northern Provinces
Flora of Swaziland
Plants described in 1910
Taxa named by Max Burret